Ludvigsson may refer to:

Anne Ludvigsson (born 1950), Swedish social democratic politician
Fredrik Ludvigsson (born 1994), Swedish professional road cyclist
Jonas F. Ludvigsson, Swedish physician and epidemiologist
Ludvig Ludvigsson Munk til Norlund (1537–1602), Danish official and count
Olle Ludvigsson (born 1948), Swedish politician and MEP
Tobias Ludvigsson (born 1991), Swedish cyclist

See also
Ludvigsen

Swedish-language surnames